The 1962 Football Championship of Ukrainian SSR (Class B) was the 32nd season of association football competition of the Ukrainian SSR, which was part of the Ukrainian Class B. It was the thirteenth in the Soviet Class B. 

The 1962 Football Championship of Ukrainian SSR (Class B) was won by FC Trudovi Rezervy Luhansk.

There was reorganization of professional football competitions with Class A being expanded by adding extra tier and all Class B competitions including in Ukraine were moved to the third tier. This season due to reorganization 35 out of 39 teams were relegated to lower tier by continuing next season to compete in the Ukrainian Class B competitions.

Format
Some 150 teams took part in competitions of the Soviet football championship in Class B. Collectives of the second echelon were distributed among 10 zones (groups) and represented all Union republics in the championship. The most teams in competitions represent the Russian Federation. They were competing not in six zones as in 1961, but in five.

The total number of teams was not diminished, and number of games in each zone increased. Also, same as in Russia, independent championship (with three zones) was conducted in Ukraine. In the rest two zones were competing teams of other Union republics. Competitions in Class B identified champion of Russian SFSR, Ukrainian SSR, and the best team of Union republics zone. All of them received a right to compete next season in the 1963 Class A.

The winning teams of championship of bigger cities, oblasts, krais, and republics were granted permission to play-off with teams of Class B of own republic and in case of win were to be promoted to Class B and the Class B teams that lost play-off were relegated out of teams of masters competitions.

The Class B teams that placed 1 through 3 in zones were freed from relegation play-offs.

Location map

Zone 1

Relegated teams
 none

Promoted teams
 FC Trubnyk Nikopol – (debut, champion of Dnipropetrovsk Oblast in 1961)

Relocated and renamed teams
 FC Lokomotyv Donetsk was last year known as FC Lokomotyv Stalino

League's standing

Zone 2

Relegated teams
 none

Promoted teams
 none

Relocated and renamed teams
 FC Dniprovets Dniprodzerzhynsk was last year known as FC Khimik Dniprodzerzhynsk
 FC Dynamo Kirovohrad was last year known as FC Zirka Kirovohrad
 FC Hirnyk Kryvyi Rih was last year known as FC Avanhard Kryvyi Rih

League's standing

Zone 3

Relegated teams
 none

Promoted teams
 FC Shakhtar Oleksandriya – (debut)

Relocated and renamed teams
 FC Dnipro Dnipropetrovsk was last year known as FC Metalurh Dnipropetrovsk

League's standing

Second stage

Places 1–6

Places 7–17

Places 18–28

Places 29–39

Relegation play-offs

 FC Volyn Lutsk - Volodymyr-Volynskyi 2:1 2:0
 FC Lokomotyv Vinnytsia - Burevisnyk Vinnytsia 4:0 0:0
 FC Verkhovyna Uzhhorod - Tochprylad Mukacheve 6:0 1:0
 FC Shakhtar Oleksandriya - Avanhard KremHESstroi 2:1 3:0
 FC Metalurh Kerch - SC Navy Sevastopol 2:1 1:0
 FC Kolhospnyk Poltava - Dnipro Kremenchuk 2:1 1:0
 FC Metalurh Zaporizhia - Azovets Berdyansk 1:0 1:0
 FC Kolhospnyk Rivno - Spartak Rivno 6:0 3:0
 FC Shakhtar Kadiivka - Metalurh Komunarsk 0:0 2:0
 FC Avanhard Sumy - SVADKU Sumy 2:0 3:1
 Naftovyk Drohobych - FC Silmash Lviv 2:1 0:3
 FC Sudnobudivnyk Mykolaiv - Vympel Mykolaiv 6:1 2:0
 FC Avanhard Ternopil - Burevisnyk Kremenets 2:1 2:0
 FC Torpedo Kharkiv - Start Chuhuiv 0:2 4:1
 FC Mayak Kherson - Enerhiya Nova Kakhovka 3:0 0:0
 FC Dynamo Khmelnytskyi - Avanhard Kamianets-Podilskyi 3:0 4:1
 FC Kolhospnyk Cherkasy - Lokomotyv Zolotonosha 3:0 4:1
 FC Avanhard Chernivtsi - Kolhospnyk Kitsman 6:1 7:0
 FC Desna Chernihiv - Pryluky 9:0 3:1
 FC Arsenal Kyiv - Temp Kyiv 2:0 2:3
 FC Spartak Ivano-Frankivsk - Avanhard Perehinske 1:1 2:0
 FC Metalurh Yenakieve - Shakhtar Horlivka 0:0 1:0
 FC Hirnyk Kryvyi Rih - ?

Please, note that FC Silmash Lviv next season was reformed into better known FC Karpaty Lviv and right away admitted to the Soviet Class A.

See also
 Soviet Second League

References

External links
 1962 season regulations.  Luhansk football portal
 1962 Soviet championships (all leagues) at helmsoccer.narod.ru

1962
2
Soviet
Soviet
football
Football Championship of the Ukrainian SSR